Treze Dias Longe do Sol (English: Thirteen Days Away From the Sun) is a Brazilian miniseries co-produced by O2 Filmes and Estúdios Globo. It was originally released on 2 November 2017 on Globoplay, Globo's streaming platform. From 8 January 2018 to 19 January 2018, one episode per night aired from Monday to Friday on Rede Globo. Written by Elena Soarez and Luciano Moura with Sofia Maldonado, it is directed by Luciano Moura with Isabel Valiente.

The series follows a group of people trapped under a collapsed building as they struggle to survive and escape, the pain of their relatives and friends as they try to learn if they survived, and attempts by the company responsible for the building's construction to preserve their public image and hide irregularities which may have contributed to the collapse. It stars Selton Mello, with Carolina Dieckmann, Paulo Vilhena, Lima Duarte, Débora Bloch, Fabrício Boliveira and Enrique Diaz.

Plot 
A medical center collapses in the final stages of construction. The engineer responsible is the ambitious Saulo (Selton Mello), who becomes the target of the press and his business partners. He is trapped in the rubble with workers and Marion (Carolina Dieckmann), a physician who is the daughter of the medical center's owner and with whom he had a relationship which ended badly. On the surface, friends and relatives of the victims deal with the pain of not knowing their fate, and Saulo's company tries to avoid being accused of causing the collapse.

Cast 
Selton Mello as Saulo Garcez
Carolina Dieckmann as Marion Rupp
Paulo Vilhena as Vitor Baretti
Débora Bloch as Gilda
Fabrício Boliveira as Marco Antônio
Lima Duarte as Dr. Rodolfo Rupp
Enrique Diaz as Newton da Nóbrega
Camila Márdila as Yasmin
Eucir de Souza as Rey Lopes
Antônio Fábio as Jesuíno
Arilson Lopes as Bené
Démick Lopes as Zica
Rômulo Braga as Daréu
Pedro Wagner as Altair
Marcos de Andrade as Messias
Maria Manoella as Ilana Krieg
Jiddu Pinheiro as Dr. Marcelo

Guest appearances 
Eucir de Souza as Captain Ney Lopes
Emiliano Queiroz as Gilda's father
Glauber Amaral as Dario
Ana Carolina Godoy as Reporter

Production 
The series spent two years  in production, and was filmed in São Paulo from December 2016 to April 2017. It featured actors from northeastern Brazil as construction workers, to give the story a realistic tone.

Episodes

Notes

References

External links 
 

2017 Brazilian television series debuts
2017 Brazilian television series endings
2010s Brazilian television series
Brazilian television miniseries
Rede Globo original programming
Portuguese-language television shows
Brazilian drama television series